Sir Martin Eugene Donnelly,  (born 4 June 1958) is a British former civil servant. He was Permanent Secretary of the Department for International Trade, until leaving the Civil Service on 24 March 2017.

Career 
Donnelly joined the Treasury in 1980. In 1988 he was Private Secretary to the Secretary of State for Northern Ireland, and from 1989 in Brussels working in the Cabinet of Leon Brittan before returning to London in 1993. In 1995 he went on secondment to the French Ministry of Finance, returning to the Treasury in 1996. From 1998 to 2003 he worked in the Cabinet Office as Deputy Head of the European Secretariat and then moved to the Immigration and Nationality Directorate of the Home Office for a year.

In 2004, Donnelly was promoted to be Director-General for Economics (later, for Europe and Globalisation) in the Foreign and Commonwealth Office. In 2008–09 he went on secondment to UK telecoms regulator Ofcom, returning to the Cabinet Office to lead the Smarter Government whitepaper. In 2010 he was briefly made acting head of the FCO after Sir Peter Ricketts became the UK's first National Security Advisor. After a few months, he was appointed as permanent secretary at BIS, succeeding Sir Simon Fraser, who replaced at the FCO.

As of September 2015, Donnelly was paid a salary of between £180,000 and £184,999, making him one of the 328 most highly paid people in the British public sector at that time.

Martin Donnelly led work to improve inclusion and gender balance across the senior civil service leadership in a range of departments. When Permanent Secretary of BIS he achieved gender balance across the senior team of 160 people, encouraging part-time working and job shares, by developing a new culture to encourage supportive team working. BIS was the first major department to achieve gender parity in its senior leadership.

In November 2017 he became a Senior Adviser with Teneo, which describes itself as "the global CEO advisory firm", providing advice to senior executives of large companies.

In June 2019, he was appointed president of Boeing Europe and managing director of Boeing UK and Ireland.

Public persona after leaving the Civil Service
In February 2018, speaking on Radio 4's Today programme, he warned that Brexit would be "giving up a three-course meal… for the promise of a packet of crisps in the future."

Personal life 
Donnelly studied Philosophy, Politics and Economics at Oxford University, international economics at the College of Europe in Bruges, and at the École nationale d'administration in Paris.

Honours
Donnelly was appointed Companion of the Order of St Michael and St George (CMG) in the 2002 Birthday Honours and Knight Commander of the Order of the Bath (KCB) in the 2016 Birthday Honours.

References 

1958 births
Living people
Permanent Under-Secretaries of State for Business, Innovation and Skills
College of Europe alumni
Alumni of Campion Hall, Oxford
Civil servants in HM Treasury
Civil servants in the Northern Ireland Office
Civil servants in the Cabinet Office
Civil servants in the Home Office
Civil servants in the Foreign Office
Private secretaries in the British Civil Service
Companions of the Order of St Michael and St George
Knights Commander of the Order of the Bath